Kane Epati (born 13 August 1981 in Samoa) is a former semi-professional rugby league footballer. Originally a rugby union player in his native Samoa, he played Rugby league for Dewsbury Rams in Championship 1 in England following stints at Doncaster Lakers, Hull Kingston Rovers, where he was a non-playing member of the Northern Rail Cup–winning squad in 2005. He has Samoan-New Zealander ancestry.

Epati represented the Cook Islands at international level, and played in the team which won the 2004 Pacific Rim tournament.

References

External links
Dewsbury Rams Profile
Statistics at rugbyleagueproject.org

1981 births
Living people
Castres Olympique players
Cook Islands national rugby league team players
Dewsbury Rams players
Expatriate rugby league players in England
Expatriate rugby union players in France
Hull Kingston Rovers players
Samoan expatriate rugby league players
Samoan expatriate rugby union players
Samoan expatriate sportspeople in France
Samoan expatriate sportspeople in England
Samoan people of Cook Island descent
Samoan rugby league players
Samoan rugby union players